William Houstoun may refer to:

William Houstoun (botanist) (1695–1733), British surgeon and botanist
William Houston (1746–1748), American teacher and statesman
William Houstoun (lawyer) (1755–1813), American lawyer, Continental Congressman for Georgia
Sir William Houstoun, 1st Baronet (1766–1842), British army officer, Governor of Gibraltar